Bow Trail is an expressway in the southwest quadrant of Calgary, Alberta.  It lends its name from the Bow River, which runs through the city north of the road itself.  It runs from downtown Calgary, where the westbound traffic continues from 6 Avenue SW and eastbound traffic becomes 9 Avenue SW, to 85 Street SW.

Bow Trail, along with 17 Avenue SW, are two major thoroughfares linking downtown Calgary to the west end of the city.  In the late 1960s, there were plans to extend Bow Trail along a more northerly alignment (roughly at the present-day 3 Avenue S) before linking with Memorial Drive east of downtown.  Fierce opposition to freeways running through downtown Calgary scuttled the plans, and the C-Train came into favour.

History

Prior to it being named Bow Trail, the road west of 33 Street SW was known as Banff Coach Road.  The road was rerouted with westbound expansion, with Bow Trail being rerouted on a more southerly route west of Sarcee Trail.  The remainder of the road exists today, as Old Banff Coach Road.  East of 33 Street SW and west of Crowchild Trail, Bow Trail conformed to Calgary's street numbering conventions, and was known as 12 Avenue SW.  12 Avenue SW continues to exist today, as a frontage road to Bow Trail.

In 2004, the city of Calgary conducted a traffic volume study along Bow Trail that found the four lane road inadequate. Consequently, an additional westbound lane was added between 33 Street and Sarcee Trail by 2006. The section between Sarcee Trail and Strathcona Boulevard was widened and landscaped by 2007, while the intersection with Sarcee Trail was improved. Although an interchange with Sarcee has been proposed for many years (with the abandoned "Go Plan" of the mid-1990s at one point proposing the interchange include a link to a southern extension of Shaganappi Trail), as of 2018 none is planned; the city built one further south at Sarcee and 17th Avenue S.W. in the late 2000s instead.

In 2010, construction of the west leg of the C-Train light rail transit system begun along the Bow Trail between Crowchild Trail and 33 Street West. This involved widening Bow Trail east of 33rd Street, and a slight realignment at 33rd and Bow to allow room for the tracks and a tunnel entrance. Construction was completed in December 2012.

As of 2015, Bow Trail ends at 85th Street, though the road actually continues for a short way beyond as 12th Avenue S.W., an unpaved rural access road. The City's transportation plan calls for Bow to eventually be extended westward from 85th Street to link with a planned southwestern leg of the Stoney Trail ring road; as of 2015, no official time frame has been announced for construction.

The eastern portion of Bow Trail (between Crowchild Trail and 14th Street N.W.) fall within the lands being considered for CalgaryNEXT, a proposed inner-city sports and recreation hub intended to consolidate the city's professional and amateur football and hockey venues (among other uses) in one location; potential rerouting of Bow Trail is among the related infrastructure concerns.

Major intersections
From east to west.

See also

Transportation in Calgary

References

Roads in Calgary